Union of Communist Struggles – The Flame (in French: Union des Luttes Communistes - La Flamme) was a communist party in Burkina Faso. ULC-La Flamme was founded in February 1987 by split from the majority of the Union of Communist Struggles - Reconstructed. In 1991 it was renamed in Party of Social Progress. 

Leaders of the party were Alain Zougba, Kader Cissé and Moïse Traoré.

The ULC-La Flamme published the periodical La Flamme.

Political parties established in 1987
Communist parties in Burkina Faso
Formerly ruling communist parties
Defunct political parties in Burkina Faso